Linnaleht was a free independent Estonian daily newspaper. The paper appeared four times a week in Tallinn both in Estonian and Russian and once a week in Tartu and Pärnu. The paper ceased publication in December 2008. It was restarted as a semi-weekly newspaper in January 2009. The last issue released on 29 October 2021.

References

External links
  

Estonian-language newspapers
Free newspapers
Mass media in Pärnu
Mass media in Tartu
Mass media in Tallinn
Publications with year of establishment missing
Russian-language newspapers published in Estonia
Defunct free daily newspapers
Defunct newspapers published in Estonia
Publications disestablished in 2008
Newspapers established in 2009
Publications disestablished in 2021